The Most Rev. Mgr. John Bonaventure Kwofie, C.S.Sp. (born 26 April 1958) was an archbishop, professed member for the Spiritan Order, prelate, theologian, and philosopher for the Catholic Church in Ghana who has been metropolitan archbishop of Accra. Previously he was bishop of Sekondi-Takoradi.

Biography 
He was born in Apowa, Ghana on 26 April 1958. He entered the seminary in Gbanga and studied theology and philosophy there, where he obtained his bachelor's degree. He joined the Spiritan Order on 1987 and ordained as priest on 1988. After his ordination as a priest, he studied in the Biblicum, where he obtained his postgraduate (licentiate) degree on the sacred scripture. On 2002-2004 he became the provincial superior for the Spiritan Order in West Africa. From 2014 until 2019 he was Bishop of Sekondi-Takoradi.  On 2 January 2019 Pope Francis appointed him as metropolitan archbishop of Accra to replace The Most. Rev. Charles G. Palmer-Buckle who had been appointed as metropolitan Archbishop of Cape Coast in 2018. He was installed as the metropolitan Archbishop of Accra on 1 March 2019 at The Cathedral Church of The Holy Spirit, Accra.

References 

1958 births
Roman Catholic archbishops of Accra
Living people
Roman Catholic bishops of Sekondi–Takoradi